Alexander Goldrun (foaled 9 February 2001 in Ireland) is a retired Thoroughbred racehorse. Bred by Dermot Cantillon, she was raced by Mrs. Noel O'Callaghan for whom she compiled a race record of 10 wins, seven seconds, and six thirds in thirty-one starts. She retired with race earnings of £1,900,740

Trained by Jim Bolger, during her career in racing Alexander Goldrun won five Group One races in four different countries :

 
 Hong Kong Cup (2004) 
 
 Prix de l'Opéra (2004) 
 
 Nassau Stakes (2005) 
 
 Pretty Polly Stakes (2005, 2006)

Pedigree

References
 Alexander Goldrun's pedigree and partial racing stats

2001 racehorse births
Thoroughbred family 22-d
Racehorses bred in Ireland
Racehorses trained in Ireland